Gemma Mary Spofforth (born 17 November 1987) is an English former competition swimmer who represented Great Britain in the Olympics, FINA world championships and European championships, and England in the Commonwealth Games.  Spofforth is the former world record-holder and former world champion in the 100-metre backstroke, and won a total of eight medals in major international championships.

Spofforth was born in Shoreham-by-Sea, England.

Spofforth represented 2008 Summer Olympics in Beijing, China, coming fourth in the 100-metre backstroke, four one-hundredths of a second (0.04) behind bronze medalist Margaret Hoelzer. She also came ninth in the 200-metre backstroke.

At the 2009 World Aquatic Championships in Rome, she took the gold medal in the 100-metre backstroke, in a world record time of 58.12 seconds. Spofforth broke the 100-metre Backstroke world record on her way to winning her first world title in Rome, her time of 58.12 erased previous record holder Anastasia Zuyeva time of 58.48 set in the semi-finals of the event.

Spofforth accepted an athletic scholarship to attend the University of Florida in Gainesville, Florida, where she swam for coach Gregg Troy's Florida Gators swimming and diving team in National Collegiate Athletics Association (NCAA) and Southeastern Conference (SEC) competition from 2007 to 2010.  During her four seasons of American college swimming, she won seven NCAA national championships, including three titles in the 100-yard backstroke (2008, 2009, 2010), three in the 200-yard backstroke (2007, 2008, 2009), and one in the 200-yard freestyle relay (2010), and was a key contributor to the Gators winning the NCAA national team championship in 2010.  She received eleven All-American honours and four All-Southeastern Conference (SEC) selections, was a two-time SEC champion, and set two SEC records.

She was a member of Great Britain's 2012 Olympic team, and competed in the 100-metre backstroke event at the 2012 Summer Olympics in London, where she achieved fifth place in 59.20 seconds.  After the 2012 Olympics, Spofforth announced her retirement from competitive swimming.

Personal bests and records held

See also 

 List of United States records in swimming
 List of University of Florida Olympians
 List of World Aquatics Championships medalists in swimming (women)
 List of world records in swimming
 World record progression 100 metres backstroke

References

External links 

  Gemma Spofforth – British Swimming profile at Swimming.org
  Gemma Spofforth – Great Britain Olympic Team athlete profile at TeamGB.com
  Gemma Spofforth – University of Florida athlete profile at GatorZone.com

1987 births
Living people
Commonwealth Games silver medallists for England
English expatriates in the United States
English female swimmers
Female backstroke swimmers
Female medley swimmers
Florida Gators women's swimmers
Olympic swimmers of Great Britain
People educated at Portsmouth High School (Southsea)
People from Shoreham-by-Sea
Swimmers at the 2008 Summer Olympics
Swimmers at the 2010 Commonwealth Games
Swimmers at the 2012 Summer Olympics
World Aquatics Championships medalists in swimming
World record setters in swimming
European Aquatics Championships medalists in swimming
Commonwealth Games medallists in swimming
Medallists at the 2010 Commonwealth Games